Yu Jeffrey Hu is a professor at Georgia Institute of Technology’s Scheller College of Business. He is a Digital Fellow at MIT's Initiative on Digital Economy.

Career
Hu's research has been published in leading journals such as Management Science, Review of Financial Studies, Information Systems Research, Management Information Systems Quarterly, and MIT Sloan Management Review, as well as in the Wall Street Journal, New York Times, Reuters, Bloomberg, InformationWeek, Wired Magazine, TIME Magazine, and INC. Magazine.

Works

Social media 
Wenqi Shen, Yu Jeffrey Hu, and Jackie Rees. (2015). Competing for Attention: An Empirical Study of Online Reviewers’ Strategic Behaviors. MIS Quarterly, 39(3) 683-696.
Hailiang Chen, Prabuddha De, Yu Jeffrey Hu, and Byoung-Hyoun Hwang. (2014). Wisdom of Crowds: The Value of Stock Opinions Transmitted Through Social Media. Review of Financial Studies.
Hailiang Chen, Prabuddha De, and Yu Jeffrey Hu. (2015). IT-Enabled Broadcasting in Social Media: An Empirical Study of Artists’ Activities and Music Sales. Information Systems Research, 26(3) 513-531.

Internet commerce and the long tail 
 Erik Brynjolfsson, Yu (Jeffrey) Hu, Duncan Simester. (2011). Goodbye Pareto Principle, Hello Long Tail: the Effect of Search Costs on the Concentration of Product Sales. Management Science, forthcoming.
 Erik Brynjolfsson, Yu (Jeffrey) Hu, Michael D. Smith. (2010). Long Tails versus Superstars: The Effect of Information Technology on Product Variety and Sales Concentration Patterns. Information Systems Research, vol. 21 (4), 736-747.
Prabuddha De, Yu (Jeffrey) Hu, Mohammad Rahman. (2010). Technology Usage and Online Sales: An Empirical Study]. Management Science, vol. 56 (11), 1930-1945.
 Erik Brynjolfsson, Yu (Jeffrey) Hu and Mohammad S. Rahman (2009). Battle of the Retail Channels: How Product Selection and Geography Drive Cross-Channel Competition. Management Science, vol. 55 (11), 1755-1765.
 Duncan Simester, Yu (Jeffrey) Hu, Erik Brynjolfsson and Eric Anderson (2009). Dynamics of Retail Advertising: Evidence from a Field Experiment. Economic Inquiry, vol. 47 (3), 482-499.
 Erik Brynjolfsson, Yu (Jeffrey) Hu and Michael D. Smith (2006). From Niches to Riches: Anatomy of the Long Tail. MIT Sloan Management Review.
 Erik Brynjolfsson, Yu (Jeffrey) Hu and Michael D. Smith (2003). Consumer Surplus in the Digital Economy: Estimating the Value of Increased Product Variety at Online Booksellers. Management Science, vol. 49 (11), 1580-1596.

Internet advertising 
 Yu Jeffrey Hu, Jiwoong Shin, and Zhulei Tang. (2016). Incentive Problems in Performance-based Online Advertising: Cost-per-Click vs. Cost-per-Action. Management Science, 62(7) 2022-2038.
 Zhulei Tang, Yu (Jeffrey) Hu and Michael D. Smith (2008). Gaining Trust Through Online Privacy Protection: Self-Regulation, Mandatory Standards, or Caveat Emptor. Journal of Management Information Systems, vol. 24 (4), 153-173.

External links 
 Yu Jeffrey Hu profile at Georgia Tech
 
 Yu Jeffrey Hu - SSRN Author Page with All Working Papers
 

Living people
Year of birth missing (living people)
University of Wisconsin–Madison College of Letters and Science alumni
Purdue University faculty
MIT Sloan School of Management alumni
Tsinghua University alumni
Information systems researchers